"In the Ghetto" is the fourth and final single from Busta Rhymes' album The Big Bang, and features R&B singer Rick James. It was produced by DJ Green Lantern and Dr. Dre.

Song information

The song samples James' "Ghetto Life" from his Street Songs album. At the end of the song Green Lantern threw in a sample of Rick James at the 2004 BET Awards in which he exclaims, "Never mind who you thought I was... I'm Rick James. Bitch!"

Music video
The video for the song was filmed between July 17–19, 2006, in New York, Baltimore and Los Angeles and was directed by Chris Robinson of HSI Productions. Pre-production and casting by Robin Frank Management, Snoop Dogg, MC Eiht, Westurn Union, Daz Dillinger, Warren G, Spliff Star, Rah Digga, DJ Green Lantern, Papoose and Ty James, the daughter of Rick James, made video cameo appearances.

Remixes
The official remix of the song features Rick James, and Ludacris as a new addition. It contains the original instrumental and the same portions from Rick James, while all the parts from Busta Rhymes and Ludacris are new. It was included in Ludacris' 2006 mixtape, Pre-Release Therapy.

Charts

References

2006 singles
Busta Rhymes songs
Rick James songs
Ludacris songs
Music videos directed by Chris Robinson (director)
Songs released posthumously
Songs written by Rick James
Song recordings produced by Dr. Dre
Aftermath Entertainment singles
Interscope Records singles